The "Old National Pike Milestones" marked each mile of the old National Road in Maryland, an eastern coastal state of the United States, from its dominating city of Baltimore to major towns of western Maryland, as Frederick, and between it and Hagerstown, to Hancock, through to Cumberland in the western panhandle of the state in the foothills of the Appalachian Mountains. The surviving stones have been included in the "National Register of Historic Places", maintained by the National Park Service of the U.S. Department of the Interior, and may be seen along the route variously designated as U.S. Route 40, Maryland Route 144, Alternate U.S. Route 40, and several other roads that trace the path of the original "Old National Pike".  From Baltimore to Cumberland, the road was surveyed and laid out with construction in several phases over different periods of time by several turnpike companies, chartered by the General Assembly of Maryland beginning in 1808.  Earlier in 1806, the United States Congress with the approval of third President Thomas Jefferson, authorized the surveying and further construction of a "national road" to continue on from Cumberland on the upstream of the Potomac River further to the west across additional mountainous ranges in the Allegheny Mountains to the newly admitted State of Ohio (admitted 1803 as the seventeenth state). Later the congressional action was amended to direct the road to the state boundaries on the Ohio River and it eventually landed at Wheeling, West Virginia. In later decades, the road was extended west across Ohio, Indiana and into the Illinois Country, to eventually terminate by the 1840s in Vandalia, the territorial capital of Illinois, just east of the Mississippi River, and northeast of the newly emergent, frontier river port metropolis of St. Louis of the Missouri Territory and the former Louisiana Purchase of 1803 to the west.

The "Old Pike" milestones in Maryland are about 30 inches tall, twelve inches wide and eight inches deep, with rounded tops and the inscription XX miles to B, referring to the distance to Baltimore, the road's terminus.  The composition of the stones varies, with the first 39 milestones of Baltimore gneiss from the area of Ellicott City. Stones from Frederick to Boonsboro are quartzite from the area of the Monocacy River. A unique white limestone with a distinctive inscription was employed from Boonsboro to Hagerstown, while west of Hagerstown the stones are gray limestone.

Sixty-nine stones still remained on the "Old National Pike" at the time the stones were nominated to the National Register.

References

External links
, including 2003 photo, at Maryland Historical Trust

Roads on the National Register of Historic Places in Maryland
Transportation in Allegany County, Maryland
Transportation in Washington County, Maryland
Transportation in Frederick County, Maryland
Transportation in Carroll County, Maryland
Transportation in Howard County, Maryland
Transportation in Baltimore County, Maryland
Buildings and structures in Hagerstown, Maryland
Buildings and structures in Frederick County, Maryland
Buildings and structures in Cumberland, Maryland
History of Baltimore
National Register of Historic Places in Allegany County, Maryland
National Register of Historic Places in Washington County, Maryland
National Register of Historic Places in Frederick County, Maryland
National Register of Historic Places in Carroll County, Maryland
National Register of Historic Places in Howard County, Maryland
National Register of Historic Places in Baltimore County, Maryland